The Heuberger Sizzler is low-wing, tricycle gear, homebuilt aircraft that was designed by Continental Air Lines engineer Larry Heuberger.

Design and development
The prototype Sizzler was started in November 1956

The Sizzler is almost a T-tail arrangement with a small amount of vertical stabilizer protruding. It is mostly aluminium construction with flush riveting. The Sizzler uses a fiberglass cowling and wing fairings. The front spar is from an Ercoupe and the nose gear is modified from a Cessna 180 tail wheel.

Variants
Heuberger Sizzler
Heuberger Sizzler II
Widened for two seats side-by-side, integrated leading edge wet-wing and larger stabilizer

Specifications (Sizzler)

See also

References

Homebuilt aircraft